Bùi Thị Xuân (d. 1802) was a Vietnamese female general during the Tây Sơn's era.

Biography
General Bùi Thị Xuân was born in Bình Khê District (now Tây Sơn District), Bình Định Province. She is said to have learned martial arts as a child, and was reputedly a strong woman. Legend has it that she once rescued Trần Quang Diệu, who later became her husband, from a tiger. She and Trần Quang Diệu joined the Tây Sơn Rebellion early, and won many battles. She helped the Tây Sơn army train elephants, which participated in many battles. She became known as one of the five principal women in the Tây Sơn Dynasty.

When Phú Xuân (Huế) fell to Nguyễn Ánh, she followed king Cảnh Thịnh to Nghệ An, commanded 5000 troops and fought the Nguyễn forces in Trấn Ninh (Quảng Bình Province). In the second month of 1802, the Nguyễn forces became victorious. She joined her husband in Nghệ An and they were captured together by the Nguyễn forces. Both of them were executed; her husband was either beheaded or skinned, while she and her teenage daughter were crushed to death by an elephant. Today, she is celebrated as a Vietnamese hero. Many major cities have schools and streets named after her.

References

1802 deaths
Deaths due to elephant attacks
Incidents of cannibalism
People executed by torture
People from Bình Định province
Tây Sơn dynasty generals
Women in war in Vietnam
Women in 19th-century warfare
Vietnamese rebels
Year of birth unknown